Grafana is a multi-platform open source analytics and interactive visualization web application. It provides charts, graphs, and alerts for the web when connected to supported data sources. There is also a licensed Grafana Enterprise version with additional capabilities available as a self-hosted installation or an account on the Grafana Labs cloud service. It is expandable through a plug-in system. End users can create complex monitoring dashboards using interactive query builders. Grafana is divided into a front end and back end, written in TypeScript and Go, respectively.

As a visualization tool, Grafana is a popular component in monitoring stacks, often used in combination with time series databases such as InfluxDB, Prometheus and Graphite; monitoring platforms such as Sensu, Icinga, Checkmk, Zabbix, Netdata, and PRTG; SIEMs such as Elasticsearch and Splunk; and other data sources. The Grafana user interface was originally based on version 3 of Kibana.

History

Grafana was first released in 2014 by Torkel Ödegaard as an offshoot of a project at Orbitz. It targeted time series databases such as InfluxDB, OpenTSDB, and Prometheus, but evolved to support relational databases such as MySQL, PostgreSQL and Microsoft SQL Server.

In 2019, Grafana Labs secured $24 million in Series A funding.

In 2020 Series B funding round: $50 million.

The conference GrafanaCon 2020 was scheduled for May 13–14, 2020, in Amsterdam, but was changed to a two-day online live streaming event due to the COVID-19 pandemic.

Grafana acquired k6 in 2021.

In 2021, Grafana Labs secured a Series C funding round of $220 million.

Adoption
Grafana is widely used, including in Wikimedia's infrastructure. Grafana has over 1000 paying customers, including Bloomberg, JP Morgan Chase, eBay, PayPal, and Sony.

Licensing
Previously, Grafana was licensed with an Apache License 2.0 license and used a CLA based on the Harmony Contributor Agreement.

As of 2021 April 20, Grafana is licensed under an AGPLv3 license.  Contributors to Grafana need to sign a Contributor License Agreement (CLA) that gives Grafana Labs the right to relicense Grafana in the future. The CLA is based on The Apache Software Foundation Individual Contributor License Agreement.

References

Free and open-source software
Projects established in 2014
System monitors
Management systems
Free network management software
2014 software
Software using the GNU AGPL license